Sei or SEI may refer to:

Arts 
Sei (album), by Brazilian singer and composer Nando Reis
"Sei", the title-song and first single from that album
Sei (film), a 2018 Tamil thriller film

Organizations and companies 
Safety Equipment Institute, a private, non-profit organization established to test safety and protective products
Scottish Episcopal Institute, the theological college of the Scottish Episcopal Church
Script Encoding Initiative, a department at UC Berkeley supporting proposals for minor and historic scripts in the Unicode Standard.
Scuba Educators International, a non-profit diver training organization
SEI Investments Company, a  financial services company headquartered in the United States
Slough Estates International, the former name for Segro
Smith Enterprise, a firearm and accessory manufacturing facility based in Tempe, Arizona that is known for making flash suppressors, muzzle brakes, sound suppressors, M14 rifles and accessories for M14 rifles.
Software Engineering Institute, a federally funded research and development center at Carnegie Mellon University
SpaceWorks Enterprises, a small aerospace engineering company in the United States
Stockholm Environment Institute, a non-profit institute that specializes in sustainable development and environmental issues
Sustainable Endowments Institute, a special project of Rockefeller Philanthropy Advisors, Inc, the Sustainable Endowments Institute (SEI) has pioneered research, education and outreach to advance resilient institutional responses to the climate crisis.
Sumitomo Electric Industries, a manufacturer in automotive, information and communications, electronics, environment and energy, and industrial materials
SUNY Eye Institute, a medical and basic sciences research institute in New York

People 
 Given name
Shō Sei (1497–1555), king of the Ryukyu Kingdom from 1526 to 1555
Shō Sei (r. 1803), king of the Ryukyu Kingdom in 1803
Sei Fujii (1882–1954), Japanese male immigrant rights activist in the United States
Sei Hatsuno (born 1976), Japanese male writer of mystery and thriller novels
Sei Ashina (born 1983), Japanese actress
Sei Kawahara (born 1995), Japanese male figure skater
A member of girl group Weki Meki

Surname
Indrek Sei (born 1972), Estonian freestyle swimmer

Other uses 
Sei whale, a baleen whale
Se'i, traditional bacon from Timor, Indonesia
Seebeck effect imaging, uses a laser to generate thermal gradients in conductors in order to locate electrically floating conductors
Secondary electron image, a type of imaging in scanning electron microscopes to view sample topography
Seri language, spoken in two Mexican villages
Service endpoint interface, a term used in Java Platform, Enterprise Edition when exposing Enterprise JavaBean as web service
Social-Emotional Intelligence (see Emotional Intelligence)
Solid-electrolyte interphase (see Lithium-ion battery)
Space Exploration Initiative, a plan envisioned by former U.S. President George H.W. Bush with crewed Moon and Mars missions
Spanish East Indies, a former Spanish colony comprising the Philippines and most of Micronesia